Cogli la prima mela is an album of the Italian singer-songwriter Angelo Branduardi. It was released in 1979 by Polydor.

The title track is a re-imagining of a medieval Hungarian melody, entitled "U naseho Barty". Also the music of "Donna ti voglio cantare" is based on a medieval melody by Pierre Attaingnant, entitled "Tourdion", which Branduardi himself recorded for his later album Futuro antico II.

The lyrics to "La raccolta" ("The harvesting") are taken from a poem by Sappho, while the music is from the Romanian folk ballad "M-am suit in dealul clujului". Finally, the song "Ninna nanna" is the Italian version of "Mary Hamilton", an English traditional song also recorded by Joan Baez.

Track listing 

"Cogli la prima mela" (3:25)
"Se tu sei cielo" (3:10)
"La strega" (4:18)
"Donna ti voglio cantare" (3:25)
"La raccolta" (4:51)
"Colori" (3:30)
"Il signore di Baux" (4:29)
"Il gufo e il pavone" (3:10)
"Ninna nanna" (7:23)

Charts

Weekly charts

Year-end charts

Certifications and sales

|}

References

1979 albums
Angelo Branduardi albums
Polydor Records albums